Mount Union is a borough in Huntingdon County, Pennsylvania, United States, approximately  southeast of Altoona and  southeast of Huntingdon, on the Juniata River. In the vicinity are found bituminous coal, ganister rock, fire clay, and some timber. A major Easter grass factory is located in the northern quadrant of the borough limits; until May 2007, the facility was owned by Bleyer Industries. The population was 2,447 at the 2010 census.

History
Mount Union was largely influenced by industry. It was at one time the world's largest producer of refractory material (silica brick), with three plants – General Refractories, United States Refractories, and Harbison Walker. The refractory business in Mount Union lasted from 1899 to about 1972, with limited production into the early 1990s. Other industries included two tanneries, a tanning extract plant, coal yards, an explosives and munitions plant (Aetna), and foundry and machine shops.

Mount Union was the northern terminus for the narrow gauge East Broad Top Railroad, connecting to the Main Line of the Middle Division of the Pennsylvania Railroad (now Norfolk Southern). The EBT maintained a large dual-gauge yard and coal cleaning plant in Mount Union and supplied coal to the Refractory plants. The EBT ceased operations in 1956 but the track is still in place and owned by the railroad. From 1998 to 2010, the Mount Union Connecting Railroad attempted to reactivate the EBT main track through Mount Union and rehabilitated it, but only a couple cars were serviced and none moved over the EBT trackage.

The Mount Union Historic District was listed on the National Register of Historic Places in 1994, with 300 significant historic structures, buildings, and homes. The population tally in 1900 was 1,086 which rose to 3,338 in 1910.

Today
The culturally significant Thousand Steps of the Standing Stone Trail are located in the Jacks Narrows, approximately two miles west of the town along U.S. Route 22. The annual Creation Festival is hosted locally (since 1984), drawing thousands of visitors in late June. Mount Union is the site of the PA Lions Beacon Lodge Camp, a summer camp for people with visual impairments and special needs, founded by Carl Shoemaker in 1948.

Geography

Education

Vocational/Technical education
Huntingdon County Career and Technology Center – shared with the three other school districts

Public education
 Mount Union Area School District
 Mount Union Area Senior High School
 Mount Union Area Junior High School
 Mapleton-Union Elementary School
 Shirley Township Elementary School
 Kister Elementary School

Public services

Emergency services
Mount Union Borough Police Department
Mount Union Ambulance Services
Mount Union Fire Department

Health care
Mount Union Area Medical Center

Postal services
Mount Union Post Office

Public library
Mount Union Community Library

Non-profit organizations
Kiwanis Club of the Mount Union Area
Allenport Lions Club
Mount Union Area Food Pantry

Demographics

As of the census of 2000, there were 2,504 people, 1,166 households, and 684 families residing in the borough. The racial makeup of the borough was 86.50% White, 11.02% African American, 0.04% Native American, 0.32% from other races, and 2.12% from two or more races. Hispanic or Latino of any race were 1.20% of the population.

There were 1,166 households, out of which 29.3% had children under the age of 18 living with them, 37.3% were married couples living together, 18.1% had a female householder with no husband present, and 41.3% were non-families. 37.7% of all households were made up of individuals, and 18.5% had someone living alone who was 65 years of age or older. The average household size was 2.15 and the average family size was 2.83.

In the borough the population was spread out, with 25.6% under the age of 18, 8.0% from 18 to 24, 24.6% from 25 to 44, 23.2% from 45 to 64, and 18.5% who were 65 years of age or older. The median age was 38 years. For every 100 females there were 81.4 males. For every 100 females age 18 and over, there were 75.7 males.

The median income for a household in the borough was $21,048, and the median income for a family was $30,582. Males had a median income of $28,464 versus $21,719 for females. The per capita income for the borough was $13,419. About 25.5% of families and 28.6% of the population were below the poverty line, including 50.0% of those under age 18 and 17.9% of those age 65 or over.

References

External links

Chamber of Commerce
Police department
Mount Union Area School District
Mount Union Borough
Mount Union Community Library

Populated places established in 1849
Boroughs in Huntingdon County, Pennsylvania
1849 establishments in Pennsylvania